Michele Padovano (born 28 August 1966) is an Italian former footballer who played as a striker.

Career 
Padovano began his professional career at Asti T.S.C. in Serie C2, before short spells at Cosenza, Pisa, Napoli and Genoa. He then signed for Reggiana; his performances there caught the eye of Juventus manager Marcello Lippi, who signed him in the summer of 1995. With Juventus, he won the UEFA Champions League in 1996, in addition to other domestic and international titles, scoring a goal in the quarter-finals against Real Madrid, as well as a penalty during the shoot-out in the final against Ajax.

During his time with Juventus, Padovano was given his only cap for Italy by manager Cesare Maldini, who played him during the 3–0 home win over Moldova, on 29 March 1997. He came on after 68 minutes, replacing fellow debutant Christian Vieri.

Padovano was eventually placed in the reserves at Juventus. After a severe knee injury, Juventus sold him to Crystal Palace in November 1997 for £1.7 million. However Padovano struggled to adapt to the Premiership, hampered by injury and poor form. He scored just once against Leicester City in twelve appearances for the club. After falling out of favour at the south London club he was sold to Metz but failed to make an impression as once again he was injured and unable to play for some months. Metz were in financial difficulties and he later returned to Palace (who was then in receivership) in the 1999–2000 season to make a million-pound claim against the club's directors for lost wages.

Padovano finished his career with Como before retiring in 2001.

Style of play 
A fast and well–rounded forward, Padovano was known for his pace, heading, and acrobatic ability in the air, as well as his physical strength, despite his modest stature and build. He possessed an accurate and powerful shot with his left foot, and was known for his ability to strike the ball quickly; moreover, he was also an accurate penalty taker. Known for his tactical intelligence, intuition, and versatility, he was a useful player for his managers, who was known for his ability to start attacking plays with long balls or to provide depth to his team by losing his markers with his runs off the ball. Furthermore, he was known for having a penchant for frequently being decisive after coming off the bench.

Imprisonment 
In May 2006, Padovano was arrested by Italian police in Torino over allegation of his implication in hashish traffic. He was later sentenced to eight years and eight months in jail.

Honours 
Cosenza
 Serie C1: 1987–88

Juventus
 Serie A: 1996–97
 Supercoppa Italiana: 1995, 1997
 UEFA Champions League: 1995–96
 UEFA Champions League: runner-up: 1996–97
 UEFA Super Cup: 1996
 Intercontinental Cup: 1996

Como
 Serie C1: 2000–01

References 

1966 births
Living people
Italian footballers
Italy international footballers
Pisa S.C. players
S.S.C. Napoli players
Genoa C.F.C. players
A.C. Reggiana 1919 players
Juventus F.C. players
Crystal Palace F.C. players
FC Metz players
Como 1907 players
Premier League players
Serie A players
Serie B players
Serie C players
Ligue 1 players
Expatriate footballers in France
Expatriate footballers in England
Italian expatriate sportspeople in France
Italian expatriate sportspeople in England
Italian expatriate footballers
Footballers from Turin
Association football forwards
UEFA Champions League winning players
Asti Calcio F.C. players